"Dag efter dag" ("Day after day") is a song in Swedish, with melody by Lasse Holm and text by Monica Forsberg. The pop and country group Chips (Kikki Danielsson and Elisabeth Andreassen) won the Swedish Melodifestivalen 1982 with it. Chips, as  representatives, finished eighth in the Eurovision Song Contest 1982.

On 18 April 1982 the song reached first place on Svensktoppen, where it stayed for nine rounds. On 13 June 1982 the song was the last to be number one on Svensktoppen, before the program was removed the first time. Chips also recorded the song with lyrics in English, "Day after Day".

Charts
In 1982, "Dag efter dag" was also released as a single. The single as best reached the 4th place at the Swedish singles chart and 5th place at the Norwegian singles chart.

Personnel
Bass – Rutger Gunnarsson
Drums – "Hulken"
Piano – Lasse Holm
Saxophone – Hans Arktoft, Hector Bingert, Ulf Andersson
Strings – Rutger Gunnarsson

Cover versions
In 1982, local cover versions were recorded by Meiju Suvas: "A huu – a heijaa" (Finnish); and by Zdenka Vučković: "Prolazi dan" (Croatian, "A Day Passes").
Dansband Ingmar Nordströms covered the song on their 1987 album Saxparty 15.
During the Siste Sjansen round of Melodi Grand Prix 2009, Elisabeth Andreassen, one half of the group Chips, came on stage and sang it with 3 women, who recreated the outfit the group wore at Melodifestivalen in 1982, three saxophone players and a school choir.

References

1982 singles
Chips (band) songs
Eurovision songs of 1982
Melodifestivalen songs of 1982
Eurovision songs of Sweden
Songs written by Lasse Holm
Female vocal duets
Songs written by Monica Forsberg
Ingmar Nordströms songs
1982 songs
Mariann Grammofon singles
Swedish-language songs